Barrowhouse GAA is a Gaelic Athletic Association club in County Laois located in the townland of Barrowhouse which is close to the border with County Kildare near the town of Athy in the Republic of Ireland.

History
Barrowhouse GAA was founded by William Langton in 1919

They lost to Portlaoise in the 1975 Laois Intermediate Football Championship Final.

Honours

 Laois Intermediate Football Championship: (3) 1980, 1985, 1992
 Laois Junior Football Championships: (4) 1927, 1946, 1974, 2015
 Laois All-County Football League Div. 2: (1) 1992 
 Laois All-County Football League Div. 3: (2) 2007, 2012 
 Laois All-County Football League Div. 4: (1) 2006
 Laois Under-21 Football Championship: 2008, 2011, 2015
 Laois Under-14 Football Championship: 1970
 Laois Under-16 Football Championship: 1971

References

Gaelic games clubs in County Laois
Gaelic football clubs in County Laois